Guy Gadowsky (born August 10, 1967) is a Canadian ice hockey coach and former professional ice hockey player. Gadowsky is currently the head coach of the Penn State University men's ice hockey team.

Early life
Gadowsky  attended Strathcona High School alongside sports broadcaster Gord Miller.

Career
Gadowsky played collegiate hockey at Colorado College and played professional hockey for the San Diego Gulls, Richmond Renegades, St. John's Maple Leafs and Prince Edward Island Senators, and Fresno Falcons. He also represented Canada on the 1993–94 Canada men's national ice hockey team, recording three goals and three assists in six games. Gadowsky also spent one season with the San Jose Rhinos professional roller hockey team in 1994.

Following his retirement as a player in 1996, Gadowsky spent three seasons as the head coach of the Fresno Falcons of the West Coast Hockey League, leading the team to three straight Taylor Cup playoff appearances. In 1999, he became the head coach of Alaska-Fairbanks and coached the team for five seasons. In 2004 Gadowsky was hired as the head coach at Princeton University. During his tenure at Princeton he led the Tigers to the 2008 ECAC Hockey Championship and to back-to-back NCAA Tournament appearances in 2008 and 2009. On April 25, 2011 he became the head coach of the Penn State Nittany Lions men's ice hockey team, becoming the program's first varsity head coach in the NCAA era for Penn State. Gadowsky took over the program starting in the 2011–12 season, during the team's transition from ACHA DI level to NCAA Division I. The team finished the regular season with a record of 27–4 and received a bid to the 2012 ACHA DI National Tournament as the number one seed and ranked first in the ACHA. The team defeated West Virginia 4–1, followed by Oklahoma 6–3 in the first rounds of the tournament before Penn State lost 3–5 to Oakland (MI) in the semifinal round. In first year as head coach of Penn State, the team finished the season with an overall record of 29–5.

Head coaching record

Minor League

College 

† 2011–12 record not included due to team playing under club status

References

External links

Guy Gadowsky's biography at GoPSUSports.com

1967 births
Living people
Canadian ice hockey right wingers
San Diego Gulls (IHL) players
Richmond Renegades players
St. John's Maple Leafs players
Prince Edward Island Senators players
Fresno Falcons players
Princeton Tigers men's ice hockey coaches
Penn State Nittany Lions men's ice hockey coaches
San Jose Rhinos players